Hugo Alarik Jonsson (25 February 1884 – 9 April 1949) was a Finnish swimmer, who competed at the 1908 Summer Olympics.

Aquatics

Olympics

National
He won some Finnish national championships in aquatics:
 4 × 50 metre freestyle relay: 1907
 Water polo: 1908, 1910, 1911

He was the chairman of the club Helsingfors Simsällskap in 1913, and a board member in 1908–1911 and 1925–1930.

Other 
His father was a master stonecutter. He married Ellen Maria Forstén in 1914.

He received the Cross of Liberty, 4th Class and the Commemorative Medal of the Liberation War.

Sources

References

External links
 

1884 births
1949 deaths
Finnish male backstroke swimmers
Olympic swimmers of Finland
Swimmers at the 1908 Summer Olympics
Swimmers from Helsinki
Finnish male breaststroke swimmers
Finnish male freestyle swimmers